Dancehall Sweethearts is the name of the third studio album by Irish rock band Horslips. Recorded during the 1974 World Cup Finals, the songs were loosely based on the travels of the famed 18th century blind harper, Turlough O' Carolan. The title and cover were chosen by the band in reaction to the record company's worry that an album about a deceased blind Irish harper would not sell in great quantities.

For this album, the addition of brass sections added a new element to Horslips' sound, as songs like Nighttown Boy and Sunburst displayed elements of blues which were new to Horslips' Celtic Rock sound. Once again, traditional jigs and reels were incorporated into Horslips' songs. A video was recorded for Ireland's national broadcaster, RTÉ, of Horslips performing King of the Fairies, a set dance, Beatles-style on the roof of Bank of Ireland's headquarters in 1975.

Track listing
Side One
"Nighttown Boy" – 5:08
"The Blind Can't Lead the Blind" – 5:20
"Stars" – 5:03
"We Bring the Summer with Us" (instrumental) – 2:32
"Sunburst" – 3:31

Side Two
"Mad Pat" – 6:17
"Blindman" – 3:33
"King of the Fairies" (instrumental) – 4:40
"Lonely Hearts" – 5:34
"The Best Years of My Life" – 1:49

Personnel 
Horslips
 Barry Devlin - bass, vocals
 Johnny Fean - guitar, banjo, vocals
 Jim Lockhart - keyboards, flute, tin whistle, vocals
 Eamon Carr - drums, bodhrán, percussions
 Charles O'Connor - fiddle, mandolin, concertina, vocals
Technical
 Fritz Fryer - producer, engineer
 George Sloan - engineer
 Paul Watkins - assistant engineer
 Ray Russell - brass arrangements
 Ian Finlay - photography

External links 
 Horslips official site - Gives lyrics and information about the album

Horslips albums
1974 albums
Albums recorded at Rockfield Studios